Jacques Maurice Roy (born September 25, 1970) was the twenty-third mayor of Alexandria, the parish seat of Rapides Parish in Central Louisiana.

A Democrat, Roy is the son of Christopher Roy Sr., an ad hoc judge of the Louisiana Third Circuit Court of Appeal. He is the brother of Christopher Roy Jr., a former one-term member of the Louisiana House of Representatives and a 2014 candidate for district attorney of the 9th Judicial District Court, based in Alexandria.

Roy graduated in 1988 from Holy Savior Menard Central High School, the Roman Catholic secondary institution in Alexandria. Prior to his having been elected mayor, Roy practiced law with his brother Chris Jr., in Alexandria. His father, Chris Roy Sr., was formerly affiliated with the firm of the legendary Alexandria lawyer Camille Gravel. Roy attended Louisiana State University, at which he majored in Political Science, with concentration in American government and politics, and Southern University Law Center, both in Baton Rouge.

In 1995, Roy married the former Wendy Hendrix (born February 26, 1972), formerly of Pine Bluff, Arkansas. They have a daughter and a son.

Election history 

Roy announced his candidacy for mayor during the first week of August 2006, the fifth of seven candidates to step forward. He campaigned on the issues of smart growth, government transparency, and inclusiveness.

On September 20 that year, Roy finished in first place in the nonpartisan blanket primary, having received over 33 percent of the vote. Delores Brewer, a Republican and chief of staff to outgoing Democratic Mayor Ned Randolph, finished in second place by a margin of only seventeen votes over Roy's fellow Democrat and Alexandria City Councilman-at-large, Roosevelt Johnson, an African American.

Although both Roy and Brewer promised to stay positive during the general election, Brewer quickly went on the offensive. She launched two highly controversial television commercials, one of which was covered nationally.

On November 7, 2006, Roy was elected by a landslide. He captured 76 percent of the vote. In 2010, Roy easily won re-election in the primary, winning more thean 63 percent of the vote in a crowded field.

In his bid for a third term as mayor in the primary election on November 4, 2014, Roy faced Jamar Gailes, Jeff Hall, Mitzi "Gibson" LaSalle, and Nicholas R. P. Wright.

Roy was considered a potential Democratic candidate in 2016 for the United States Senate seat vacated by Republican David Vitter, who failed in a bid for governor in 2015. Roy never filed for the race, and victory went to Democrat-turned-Republican John N. Kennedy, the former state treasurer.

On November 8, 2022, Roy was elected Mayor of the City of Alexandria gaining 51% of the vote against his multiple opponents including Jeff Hall the incumbent candidate. Roy began his 4th term as Mayor on December 5, 2022.

Accomplishments 

During his first term, Roy launched the S.P.A.R.C. (Special Planned Activity Redevelopment Corridors) Initiative, the largest redevelopment program in the city's history. Economist Donovan Rypkema believes S.P.A.R.C. is the "right" kind of "stimulus project," and renowned architect Frederic Schwartz considers S.P.A.R.C. to be "the most concise vision" for revitalization in the country.

Veteran Mayor Joseph Riley of Charleston, South Carolina, has also praised Roy's vision and his leadership. "Show me a community with real inventive, aggressive, thoughtful, creative leadership (like Roy), and I will show you a community on the move," Riley told The Town Talk.

Roy created Alexandria's first-ever diversity program, Diversity in Action, which he referenced in his first inaugural address. "Diversity works; inclusiveness makes money; community-based planning positively affects cities," Roy said. As a result of his initiative, Roy has significantly increased the number of small, emerging, minority, and/or women-owned businesses that work with the city of Alexandria.

During his first term, Roy ordered a comprehensive audit of the Alexandria Police Department, which was conducted by the International Association of Chiefs of Police. Roy is a proponent of community policing and Crime Prevention Through Environmental Design (CPTED) strategies. Gregory Saville, co-founder of the International CPTED Association, wrote in an article titled "Uptapping Kinetic Energy: Civic Potential Under the Surface": "... I met one of those rare leaders committed to making that kinetic energy work - re-elected Mayor Jaques Roy. He absolutely got what SafeGrowth can mean in his community. He is also just the quality of civic leader to muster the community energy to make it happen."

On July 15, 2013, Roy was among nine mayors who established Social Media Giving Day to encourage citizens to support charities via social media.

Roy was involved with the Louisiana Municipal Association. He co-chaired Louisiana's first-ever World Cultural Economic Forum, which was spearheaded by then Lieutenant Governor Mitch Landrieu, the mayor of New Orleans. Landrieu's sister, U.S. Senator Mary Landrieu, considers Roy among the nation's leading advocates for smart growth: "He's been one of the most outstanding mayors in our whole state and actually our whole country on this issue," she told KALB-TV in Alexandria.

Executive staff 
Kay Michiels, Chief Administrative Officer
Michael Caffery, Deputy Chief Administrative Officer
David Gill, Chief of Staff
Tonya Corley, Deputy Chief of Staff

Stepping down

Mayor Roy did not seek a fourth term in the nonpartisan blanket primary on November 6, 2018, and finished his term in December 2018. Jeff Hall,  who lost to Roy in 2014, and the next year became a state representative, again ran for mayor on "a pro-business, pro-people platform that brings jobs back, grows existing businesses, and makes city government something that actually works. Do you think the city is better today than it was eleven years ago?"  Hall defeated two white Democratic women in the race: attorney Catherine Louise Davidson (born August 12, 1968) and Kay Michiels.

In 2022, however, Roy won a large victory, 53 to 22 percent, over Hall to obtain his fourth nonconsecutive term as mayor.

Notes
 Louisiana Secretary of State Official Parish Election Results for Election Date: 11/07/06
 Louisiana Secretary of State Election Results by Precinct-Official Results for Election Date: 11/07/06 Mayor, City of Alexandria
 Louisiana Secretary of State Official Parish Election Results Results for Election Date: 9/30/06
 Louisiana Secretary of State Election Results by Precinct-Official Results for Election Date: 9/30/06 Mayor City of Alexandria
 JacquesRoyForMayor.com
 Louisiana Secretary of State Parish Elected Officials: Rapides
 Campaign Ads - What Do You Think? KALB-TV Video blog
 Brewer, Roy and Johnson Interviews Election Night KALB-TV Video blog
 Conversation with the Candidates - The Race for Mayor of Alexandria KALB-TV Video blog
 SPARC and the Economy
 Alexandria SPARC summit speaker: Leadership, infrastructure investment key to progress 
 Diversity in Action
 Mayor Roy: There Is a New Deposit in the Bank of Justice
 Jacques Roy Executive Order 2009-2
 Untapping Kinetic Energy: Civic Potential Under the Surface
 Landrieu Praises Alexandria Mayor's Vision, Leadership

References

External links
 City of Alexandria, La. Official Website
 Jacques M. Roy Louisiana Campaign Disclosure Report

1970 births
Living people
Mayors of Alexandria, Louisiana
Louisiana State University alumni
Southern University Law Center alumni
Holy Savior Menard Central High School alumni
Louisiana Democrats